Mariñelarena or Marinelarena is a Basque surname that has its origins in the village of Betelu, located north of Navarra, Spain, bordering on Gipuzkoa.

Etymology and history
The surname means in the Basque language "...of the sailor". Usually modern surnames originated in the Basque Country as name of houses, being families known by the name of the house they inhabited once. Few Basque surnames were of patronymic origin, but there are some, and Mariñelarena could be one of them, meaning "(son) of the sailor". However, it could also be referring to a house: "(house) of the sailor".

Coat-of-arms
Mariñelarena is a family recognized with a coat-of-arms, because most Basque families (if not all) have their nobility recognized.

It is conformed by a two Argent (silver) flags over an Azure (blue) tower with Argent (silver) small windows, that stands in an Or (gold) background.

Familiar Lineage in Betelu
 Marinelarena, Miguel de; Owner of Juangorena.
Noble neighbor on 1695

 Marinelarena, Juanes de; Owner of Ochotorena.
Regency on 1700.

 Marinelarena, Martiarano; Owner of Juangorena.
Regency on 1700.

 Marinelarena, Martín de; Owner of Juangorena.
Mayor's lieutenant on 1703
Mayor on 1712
Regency on 1727
Mayor on 1731
Mayor's lieutenant on 1735
Regency on 1738
Regency on 1748

 Marinelarena, Lorenzo de; Owner of Garciarena.
Regency on 1718

 Marinelarena, Juan Fermín de; Owner of Garciarena.
Regency on 1742
Mayor's lieutenant on 1745
Mayor on 1747
Mayor's lieutenant on 1749
Regency on 1753 and 1763

 Marinelarena, Martiarano; Owner of Juangorena.
Mayor on 1762

 Marinelarena, Martín de; Owner of Bengoechea de Suso or Juangorena & Migueltorena.
Regency on 1773
Mayor on 1782
Regency on 1785

 Marinelarena, Ramón Antonio de; Owner of Garciarena & Echezarra.
Regency on 1778
Mayor on 1776
Mayor's lieutenant on 1779
Regency on 1784 and 1796
Mayor's lieutenant on 1802 and 1804

 Marinelarena, Juan Fermín de; Owner of Echeverria & Garciarena.
Regency on 1806
Mayor on 1809

Notable people sharing the surname "Mariñelarena"
Alejandro J. Mariñelarena, Microbiologist.
Alex Mariñelarena, BMW Motorrad pilot.
David Mariñelarena Saralegi, Basque rural sports champion.
Erik Mariñelarena, Mexican filmmaker.
Iñaki Mariñelarena, Basque pelota gold medal winner.
Joaquín José Fraile Mariñelarena, Spanish painter.
Lilia Ivonne Mariñelarena Ramírez, Mexican singer.
Mariana Mariñelarena, International percussionist.
Christian Mariñelarena, power conversion engineer and designer. Crankshaft

External links
Genealogy records.
Araldis Heraldry shop online.

Basque-language surnames
Spanish family coats of arms
Marinelarena
Marinelarena